"Farewell to the Fairground" is a song by London-based indie rock band White Lies. It was released on 23 March 2009 by Fiction Records. It was their third single from debut album To Lose My Life..., and fourth single overall. The band recorded a video for the track with director Andreas Nilsson, filmed in Nikel, Russia.

History and release 
"Farewell to the Fairground" was recorded along with nine other tracks in Brussels' ICP Studios between May and September 2008. In a track-by-track review of their debut album for NME, the band stated that it was one of a number of songs which were written particularly quickly during the recording process, as they had only recorded demo versions of five tracks prior to signing to Fiction and entering the studio. The band described it as one of their more upbeat tracks. A remix of the song, titled "Farewell to the Fairground (Yuksek Remix)", previously appeared as a B-side to previous single "To Lose My Life". The single featured the band's cover version of Kanye West's "Love Lockdown" as a B-side. The single charted at No. 84 in the week of its release. It then rose to No. 33 the week after, becoming the band's highest charting single.

Track listing 
CD
"Farewell to the Fairground (Single Mix)"
"Farewell to the Fairground (Future Funk Squad's 'Black Truth' Remix)"

7" vinyl (1)
"Farewell to the Fairground (Single Mix)"
"Love Lockdown (Radio 1 Live Lounge Version)"

7" vinyl (2)
"Farewell to the Fairground (Single Mix)"
"Farewell to the Fairground (Rory Phillips White Horse Mix)"

iTunes EP
"Farewell to the Fairground (Single Mix)
"Love Lockdown (Radio 1 Live Lounge Version)"
"Farewell to the Fairground (Rory Phillips White Horse Mix)"
"Farewell to the Fairground (Disco Bloodbath Remix)"

Charts

In other media 
The song was featured in the 2012 video game Forza Horizon, playing on the Horizon Rocks station.

References

External links 
White Lies' official website

2009 singles
White Lies (band) songs
Protest songs
Song recordings produced by Ed Buller
2008 songs
Fiction Records singles